Marilena Doiciu (born 3 July 1967) is a Romanian former handballer who played for the Romania national team. She also competed in the 1993 World Championship, being part of the Romanian team which finished 4th. She most notably played for Rapid București, captaining the club for many years, and was also the captain of Romania.

International trophies   
IHF Cup:
Winner: 1993

References

1967 births
Living people
Sportspeople from Bucharest
Romanian female handball players
CS Minaur Baia Mare (women's handball) players
Expatriate handball players
Romanian expatriate sportspeople in Greece